The Idiot Weekly, Price 2d was the first real attempt to translate the humour of The Goon Show to television. It was made by Associated-Rediffusion during 1956 and was broadcast only in the London area.

It combined elements of a sitcom and sketch comedy with Peter Sellers as the editor of a tatty Victorian newspaper, The Idiot Weekly. The headlines of the paper were used as links to comedy sketches.

Although written mainly by Spike Milligan, there were many contributions from members of Associated London Scripts, the writers' co-operative, including Dave Freeman and Terry Nation. Eric Sykes was credited as the script editor. The series was produced and directed by Richard Lester.

It was followed by A Show Called Fred and Son of Fred. The title was revived by Spike Milligan for his Australian radio series The Idiot Weekly which ran from 1958.

References

External links
 BBC Comedy Guide - The Idiot Weekly, Price 2d

1956 British television series debuts
1956 British television series endings
1950s British comedy television series
British surreal comedy television series
ITV comedy